The Cathedral of Saint Peter is the mother church of the Roman Catholic Diocese of Belleville, located in Belleville, Illinois.

The cathedral parish of Saint Peter was founded in 1842 at a location east of the present structure, and named after Saint Barnabas the Apostle; it was rededicated to Saint Peter in 1847.  By 1863, the congregation recognized the need for a larger structure.  It constructed a brick church on the cathedral's present site which it dedicated in 1866.

In 1887, Pope Leo XIII created the Diocese of Belleville from the southern portion of the Diocese of Alton (now the Diocese of Springfield) and named Reverend John Janssen as the first bishop.  Janssen chose St. Peter's as his cathedral.

On January 4, 1912, around 6 p.m., neighborhood children noticed a fire in the upper portion of the building. Although they arrived quickly, firefighters were hampered in their efforts to extinguish the blaze by a lack of water pressure to reach the  roof and the bitter  temperatures.  Water company officials blamed the poor water pressure on a broken valve at the water station.  Soon, the fire burned through the roof timbers, which fell and ignited other parts of the structure.  When the fire was extinguished, all that remained were the exterior walls and bell tower.  One local newspaper estimated the damage at US$100,000 and said that insurance would cover only $40,000 of the repairs.

The present structure's Gothic architecture was modeled after that of the Cathedral of Exeter, England.  It was designed by the architect Victor Klutho.  The brick walls were covered with Winona split-face dolomitic limestone accented with Indiana limestone in 1956.  The sanctuary was renovated in 1968, to conform to directives of the Second Vatican Council, and the south end of the cathedral expanded to increase capacity to 1,270.  A mass in January 2012, marked the centennial of the fire and rebuilding, and also  reinstallation of the pulpit and cathedra canopy which were removed during the 1968 work.

The cathedral houses a three-manual, 40-rank organ by the M. P. Moller Company that dates from 1968.  A second console has been added along with four ranks of pipes.

See also
List of Catholic cathedrals in the United States
List of cathedrals in the United States

References

External links 

Official Cathedral Site
Roman Catholic Diocese of Belleville Official Site
Diocesan profile page (including mass schedule)
A thorough photographic tour of the cathedral

Peter Belleville
Churches in the Roman Catholic Diocese of Belleville
Churches in St. Clair County, Illinois
Buildings and structures in Belleville, Illinois
Religious organizations established in 1842
Roman Catholic churches completed in 1866
19th-century Roman Catholic church buildings in the United States
1842 establishments in Illinois